Facebook Safety Check (sometimes called Facebook Crisis Response) is a feature managed by the social networking company Facebook. The feature is activated by the company during natural or man-made disasters and terror-related incidents to quickly determine whether people in the affected geographical area are safe.

History

Release 
The feature was developed by Facebook engineers, inspired by people's use of social media to connect with friends and family in the wake of the 2011 Tōhoku earthquake and tsunami. Originally named the Disaster Message Board, it was renamed to Safety Check prior to release. It was introduced on October 15, 2014. Its first major deployment was on Saturday, April 25, 2015, in the wake of the April 2015 Nepal earthquake. The tool was deployed again in the wake of the May 2015 Nepal earthquake, during Pacific Hurricane Patricia in October 2015, and during the November 2015 Paris attacks, the latter being the first time the tool was used in response to a non-natural disaster. On March 22, 2016, during reports of explosions at an airport and train station in Brussels, the feature was turned on again, but there was a delay in turning it on after it was revealed it was a suicide bomber attack.

On June 2, 2016, Facebook announced that it would start experimenting with community-activated Safety Checks. With the new system, Safety Check would be activated based on combination of a certain number of people posting about a particular crisis plus an alert from one of Facebook's third-party sources. Users would also be able to share and spread the word about the Safety Check once it was activated. Facebook hoped the changes would lead to more consistent, frequent, and streamlined deployments around the world.

On February 8, 2017, Facebook introduced a Community Help feature to the Safety Check crisis response tool. It allows users to search through categorized posts, offer local assistance, and connect with providers over Facebook Messenger.  In June 2017, Facebook announced several updates to Safety Check, including the Community Help feature coming to desktops.  It was also made possible for users to start fundraisers from within Safety Check.

Deployment in the context of the Nepal earthquake 

On Saturday, April 25, 2015, an earthquake struck Nepal, with an estimated loss of a few thousand lives. Within a few hours of the earthquake hitting, Facebook had activated Safety Check in the region. It identified users as possibly being in the affected area by their current city as listed on their profile, as well as the place from which they had most recently accessed Facebook. The desktop version of Safety Check also provided a brief synopsis of the event and emergency contact numbers.

During the activation more than 7 million people in the affected area were marked safe, which generated notifications to over 150 million friends on the platform.

The tool was deployed again in the wake of the May 2015 Nepal earthquake, and received attention when some people outside the affected area were reported by Facebook as marked safe.

Deployment during November Paris attacks 
Facebook deployed the feature during November 2015 Paris attacks. This was the first time Facebook activated the feature for a violent attack (or any non-natural disaster), mentioning that the policy for activation and the product itself is an ongoing work in progress.

Other deployments

Reception

Reception upon release 
Upon the release of Safety Check, Richard Lawler wrote in Engadget praising the tool, writing "[I]t can take some pressure off of overloaded infrastructure with everyone trying to call affected areas after disasters hit, and of course, save you from a post-tragedy chewing out for failure to let people know you're fine." On the flip side, he posited that Safety Check might be "a cagey way to try to take some of the creepiness out of the apps' location tracking features".

Reception of deployment for April 2015 Nepal earthquake 
Commentators praised Facebook Safety Check in the wake of the April 2015 Nepal earthquake and compared it to Google Person Finder, a tool by Google with a similar purpose. However, commentators noted that due to low penetration of mobile devices and poor network connectivity in the region (which had worsened due to the earthquake), many of the people in the target audience of the tool would not be able to use it. This was likened to similar problems faced by Google Person Finder during the 2010 Pakistan floods.

Reception of deployment for May 2015 Nepal earthquake 
After the May 2015 Nepal earthquake, BuzzFeed reported that many users outside the geographical area affected by the earthquake were marking themselves as safe using the tool, and that this was angering other users who thought they were being insensitive to the toll and tragedy of the event. The story was picked up by other publications including the Huffington Post and fact-checking website Snopes, which noted that this was due to a bug in Facebook leading it to prompt people outside the affected area to confirm whether they were safe.

See also

 Google Person Finder

References

Facebook
Safety
Facebook software